The American Society for Reproductive Medicine (ASRM) is a nonprofit, multidisciplinary organization for advancement of the science and practice of reproductive medicine. The society has its headquarters in Washington, D.C and its administrative office in Birmingham, Alabama.

History and activities
Founded in 1944 by a small group of fertility experts who met in Chicago, the initial name was the American Society for the Study of Sterility, later the American Fertility Society (AFS). Though primarily an American organization,  it had members from over 100 countries as of 2020. The society hosts an annual scientific congress, as well as courses, seminars, workshops and publications.  Special interest groups are focused on a range of reproductive medicine topics. ASRM has an Ethics Committee that provides guidance on ethical issues. The ASRM Practice Committee issues clinical guidelines and reports.

World Health Organization NSA status 
In May 2014, the ASRM became an associated a non-state actor (NSA) with the World Health Organization (WHO).

Publications
Publications of the ASRM include:
 Fertility and Sterility – Peer reviewed monthly official publication of the American Society for Reproductive Medicine, Society for Reproductive Endocrinology and Infertility, Society of Reproductive Surgeons, Society for Assisted Reproductive Technology, Society for Male Reproduction and Urology, Pacific Coast Reproductive Society and Canadian Fertility and Andrology Society.
 Journal of Assisted Reproduction and Genetics – Published monthly; was published as Journal of In Vitro Fertilization and Embryo Transfer before 1992
 Ethics Committee Reports and Statements – Ethical issues in reproduction are addressed by the Ethics Committee that published guidelines for medical practitioners.
 Practice Committee Guidelines – Practice Committee summarizes consensus opinions on  medical standards and educational bulletins.
 Patient Education Fact Sheets and Booklets – series produced under the direction of the ASRM Patient Education Committee and the Publications Committee.

See also
 European Society of Human Reproduction and Embryology
 Human Fertilisation and Embryology Authority
 Assisted Human Reproduction Canada

References

External links
 ASRM Home page
 Fertility and Sterility
 Journal of Assisted Reproduction and Genetics
 ReproductiveFacts.org – the ASRM patient education portal

Medical associations based in the United States
Medical and health organizations based in Alabama
Obstetrics and gynaecology organizations